The Karusa Wind Power Station, is a 147 MW wind-power plant in South Africa. The wind farm which achieved commercial commissioning in June 2022 was developed by Enel Green Power, a subsidiary of Enel, the Italian energy conglomerate. Under a 20-year power purchase agreement, the power station sells the energy generated here to Eskom Holdings, the national electricity utility parastatal company.

Location

Overview
The power station comprises 35 turbines manufactured by Vestas, based in Denmark, each rated at 4.2 MW, capable of generating 147 MW at peak production. Enel Green Power won the concession to build this power station in 2016 as part of the 4th window of the Renewable Energy Independent Power Producer Procurement Programme  (REIPPP), of the South African government.

Ownership
In 2021, Qatar Investment Authority, the sovereign wealth fund of Qatar, signed a joint venture agreement with Enel Green Power, thereby becoming a co-owner in this power station. The table below illustrates the ownership of Karusa Wind Powr Station.

Construction
The engineering, procurement and construction contract was awarded to Vestas Wind Systems, based in Denmark. Construction began in 2019 and commercial commissioning occurred in June 2022.

Cost and funding
The cost of construction is reported as €200 million. This project received loan support from Absa Group Limited and Nedbank Group, both large South African financial houses.

Other considerations
Karusa Wind Power Station is one of five wind park concessions awarded to Enel Green Power, under the South African government's Renewable Energy Supply Programme (REIPPP). The other four wind farms are Oyster Bay Wind Power Station, Garob Wind Power Station, Nxuba Wind Power Station and Soetwater Wind Power Station. As of July 2022, Enel Green Power had a generation portfolio of 1,257 MW in South Africa, which included wind and solar power stations.

See also
 List of power stations in South Africa

References

External links
 Location of Karusa Wind Farm, South Africa

Economy of the Western Cape
Wind farms in South Africa
Energy infrastructure in Africa
2022 establishments in South Africa
Energy infrastructure completed in 2022
Central Karoo District Municipality
21st-century architecture in South Africa